David Mike Broda (September 17, 1944 – June 13, 2010) was a Canadian politician. He served in the Legislative Assembly of Alberta from 1997 to 2004 as a member of the Progressive Conservative caucus.

Political career
Broda ran twice as the Progressive Conservative candidate in the federal electoral district of Beaver River, first in a 1989 by-election upon the death of incumbent John Dahmer and then in the 1993 federal election. He lost both times to Deborah Grey of the Reform Party.

Broda ran in the 1997 Alberta general election as the Progressive Conservative candidate in the electoral district of Redwater.  He defeated Liberal incumbent Mary Anne Balsillie by less than 300 votes.

Broda ran for a second term in the 2001 Alberta general election. He easily defeated three other candidates with a landslide majority to hold his seat.

During his time in office he served as chair of the advisory council on Alberta-Ukraine relations.

Broda retired from provincial politics in 2004 at dissolution of the assembly.

Late life and death
After retiring from provincial politics Broda was appointed by the Government of Alberta to serve on the Alberta Surface Rights Board in April 2005 to serve as Vice-Chairman. His appointed term on the board was scheduled until March 31, 2010.

Broda died in a car crash outside of Edmonton on June 13, 2010 after leaving a barbecue event held on behalf of the Canada-Ukraine Chamber of Commerce in the town of Mundare, Alberta.

Electoral results

References

External links
Legislative Assembly of Alberta Members Listing

2010 deaths
Progressive Conservative Association of Alberta MLAs
Canadian people of Ukrainian descent
Road incident deaths in Canada
Accidental deaths in Alberta
1944 births
21st-century Canadian politicians